The 2023 Israeli anti-judicial reform protests are a series of street protests which began in various cities in Israel in early 2023. The protests are against the judicial reform proposed by the government of recently re-elected prime minister Benjamin Netanyahu. Protests have been taking place on Saturday evenings, in Tel Aviv and other cities, starting on 7 January, as well as in various locations on selected weekdays.

Background 

Since the political crisis beginning in 2018, multiple snap elections were held following unsuccessful attempts to form a governing coalition. The 2021 election was the first to have resulted in a successful government formation. The incumbent coalition, which held a one-seat majority, collapsed in June 2022 after a member defected. In the snap legislative election that followed, the incumbent government, led by Yair Lapid, was defeated by a coalition of right-wing parties, led by former prime minister Benjamin Netanyahu, who formed a new government that took office on 29 December 2022.

On 4 January 2023, newly appointed Justice Minister Yariv Levin announced plans to reform Israel's judiciary, including limiting the power of the Supreme Court and of the government's legal councillors, and granting the governing coalition a majority on the committee that appoints judges. Following the announcement, several organizations, including Crime Minister and Omdim Beyachad, announced their intention to organize protests in Tel Aviv on 7 January.

Events

January

7 January 
A protest attended by about 20,000 people took place in Tel Aviv's Habima Square on 7 January 2023, with Ayman Odeh appearing as a guest speaker. A smaller protest took place in Haifa that was attended by 200 people.

14 January 
A second protest was organized in Habima Square one week after the initial demonstration. Approximately 80,000 people attended the protest, while smaller rallies took place in Haifa and Jerusalem, numbering 2,500 and 3,000 attendees respectively.

21 January 
Another protest soon followed at Kaplan Street in central Tel Aviv. Israeli Police estimated that over 100,000 people attended the protest, with smaller protests taking place in cities such as Haifa, Jerusalem and Be'ersheba.

28 January 

A fourth protest took place on 28 January at Kaplan Street as well. The number of protesters in Tel Aviv decreased while their numbers in Haifa and Jerusalem increased. Around this time, the protests started gaining international attention as the U.S. Secretary of State Anthony Blinken visited Israel and spoke with Netanyahu about the judicial reform.

February

4 February 
A fifth protest took place at Kaplan Street. Haaretz estimated that 60,000 people attended the protests nationally, while The Jerusalem Post's estimate included over 100,000 attendees in Tel Aviv alone. Protests occurred all across the country with rallies taking place in cities such as Rishon LeZion, Ness Ziona and Herzliya.

11 February 
A sixth protest took place at Kaplan Street, where former Foreign Minister Tzipi Livni appeared as a guest speaker. Haaretz estimated 50,000 people attended the protest, with an additional 30,000 people attending other protests around the country, including Kfar Saba, Jerusalem, and Haifa. Organizers estimated 150,000 people attended the Kaplan protest alone.

13 February 
On 8 February, the Chairman of the Knesset's Constitution, Law, and Justice committee, Simcha Rothman, announced it would vote on referring several reforms to the Knesset Plenum, including a law giving the coalition a majority on the judicial appointments committee, on 13 February. The previous day, several protest leaders, including former Chief of the General Staff Moshe Ya'alon and the Movement for Quality Government in Israel, announced their intention to organize a general strike and a protest outside the Knesset building on the same date, which was believed to be the vote's date before the announcement was made. 

More than 100,000 people gathered for protests in Jerusalem on 13 February, while individuals in several industries, including doctors and the tech workers, went on strike. That day, the Constitution committee voted 9–7 in favor of the reforms.

18 February 
On 18 February, protesters marched in Tel Aviv and other cities around Israel, marking the seventh weekend of demonstrations since the judicial reforms were presented. Organizers stated that about a quarter million Israelis participated in the protests at more than 60 locations around the country, including the roughly 135,000 protesters who marched from the Dizengoff Center to Kaplan Street in Tel Aviv.

Organizers of the rally in central Tel Aviv screened a speech from 2012 by Benjamin Netanyahu, in which the Prime Minister stated his belief in a strong judiciary, and his intent to protect the independence of Israeli Courts.

20 February 

On 20 February, more than 100,000 people gathered outside the Knesset in Jerusalem to protest "an initial plenum vote on bills that would give politicians control over appointments to Israel’s supreme court, and limit its ability to overturn laws." Protesters blocked key highways and stopped several officials from leaving their residences. Netanyahu criticized the movement's leadership for "threatening us with civil war and blood in the streets" at a meeting with lawmakers from the Likud party.

25 February 

Protests continued throughout the country. There were 160,000 protesters in Tel Aviv (according to Channel 13), 30,000 in Haifa (according to the police), and about 5,000 in Ra'anana (according to Haaretz).

In Tel Aviv, the protest was preceded by a performance of 150 members of the Bonot Alternativa ("Building an Alternative") women's group, wearing red-and-white outfits resembling those worn by handmaids in the television series The Handmaid's Tale. The group appeared in protest of some of the proposed legal changes, which they believe will hurt women.

The economist Jacob Frenkel, the former governor of Israel's Central Bank, and Elyakim Rubinstein, former Vice President of the Supreme Court of Israel, participated in the protests.

March

1 March 

1 March was designated a 'national day of disruption'. Protesters tried to block the Ayalon highway in Tel Aviv, but police used stun grenades, mounted police, and water cannons against the demonstrators, and arrested several people. Netanyahu and National Security Minister Itamar Ben-Gvir both said that all protesters blocking the roads are anarchists who should be arrested. Later that evening, the Prime Minister's wife, Sara Netanyahu, was spotted at a hair salon in Tel Aviv. Protesters stood outside the salon for three hours while mounted police was guarding the entrance. After three hours, Netanyahu was escorted out by police.

4 March 

Protests took place in or near Ashkelon, Arad, Bat Yam, Beersheba, Haifa, Herzliya, Holon, Jerusalem, Kiryat Ono, Kiryat Shmona, Ra'anana, Tel Aviv, and other places. Channel 12 estimated that 160,000 people attended protests in Tel Aviv alone.

National Security Minister Itamar Ben-Gvir spoke to the press on from police headquarters in Tel Aviv, saying that he has no intention of apologizing to anyone, "certainly not to the anarchists who seek to set the State of Tel Aviv on fire."

Various opposition lawmakers attended the protests. Leader of the Opposition Yair Lapid attended the protest in Herzliya, leader of the opposition party Yisrael Beiteinu Avigdor Lieberman spoke in Ashdod, and leader of the National Unity Party Benny Gantz spoke in Beersheba. Additionally, Former Minister of Education and Likud member Limor Livnat spoke at the protest in Tel Aviv.

Addressing the protesters in Ra'anana, Moshe Ya'alon said that Netanyahu had lost touch with reality. Tzipi Livni expressed support for the protests, stating that they were the most important she had ever attended. Another speaker at the event in Ra'anana was former Police Commissioner Roni Alsheich.

A large banner carried by protesters in Tel Aviv showed pictures of Finance Minister Bezalel Smotrich and National Security Minister Itamar Ben-Gvir, with the text "Yesterday Huwara, tomorrow Israel", against the backdrop of a picture from the settler rampage in the West Bank town of Huwara.

8 March 
Over 25,000 women dressed in red formed human chains in 70 locations across Israel, combining the commemoration of International Women’s Day with the wave of protests opposing the government’s judicial reform. The event was organized by Building an Alternative, the grassroots women’s organization behind the handmaid vigils. When announcing the event earlier, it declared that Israeli women were "drawing a red line" when it comes to the violation of women’s rights.

9 March 

The protest movement led what was referred to as a 'national day of resistance'. Protesters blocked roads and maritime routes, including one of the country's main highways, Ayalon, which connects all of the major traffic routes leading to Tel Aviv. Convoys of cars packed the Tel Aviv-Jerusalem highway and streamed toward Ben Gurion Airport's main terminal. The protest at the airport came hours before Netanyahu flew to Rome to meet Italian Prime Minister Giorgia Meloni.

11 March 

More than 500,000 people participated in protests in many cities across the country.

See also 
 2020–2021 protests against Benjamin Netanyahu
 2018–2022 Israeli political crisis

References

Further reading

 
 
 

2023 protests
Protests
January 2023 events in Israel
Protests in Israel
Benjamin Netanyahu